Lamprocyphus germari is a species of the true weevil family.

Description 
This rare beetle is glossy, light green, with black spots surrounded by coppery scales.

Distribution 
This species occurs in Brazil.

Etymology 
The species name honours Ernst Friedrich Germar.

References 

 Catalogue of Life
 Universal Biologican Indexer
 Global species

External links 
 EntreInsectos.com
 Ecoregistros
 Coleop.terra
 World Field Guide
 Lamprocyphus germari in News.fr.msn

Entiminae
Beetles described in 1833